Xeremiers or colla de xeremiers is a traditional ensemble that consists of flabiol (a five-hole tabor pipe) and xeremies (bagpipes). Majorca has produced popular singer-songwriters like Maria del Mar Bonet. British DJs like Paul Oakenfold made the vacationing island of Ibiza a capital of house music, leading to the creation of Balearic Beat.  Francesc Guerau and Antoni Literes are among the best known classical composers of the islands.

References
Antoni Pizà: Alan Lomax: Mirades Miradas Glances (Barcelona: Lunwerg / Fundacio Sa Nostra, 2006)

External links

Balearic Islands
Balearic music